Squalius aradensis is a ray-finned fish species in the family Cyprinidae, growing to  SL. It is endemic to Portugal where it is found in only three river basins: Arade, Algibre, and Bordeira basins. It is threatened by water extraction, drought, and introduction of exotic fish species.

Squalius aradensis is an ubiquitous species which inhabits small to medium-sized streams with Mediterranean water regime. It may be restricted to very small pools during summer. It breeds in shallow riffle habitats in fast-flowing water.

References

Squalius
Endemic fauna of Portugal
Freshwater fish of Europe
Fish described in 1998
Taxonomy articles created by Polbot